Celeste A. Morello is an American historian and criminologist specializing in the studies of the Mafia in the Philadelphia area. Recognized along with her prolific record as a nominator of buildings and artwork with the Philadelphia Historical Commission, to date, she has nominated the most Pennsylvania historical markers approved by the Pennsylvania Historical and Museum Commission. Morello has been called one of "the most active preservationists in the city". (Philadelphia Inquirer, January 17, 2016)

Background
Born in Norristown Pa; resides in Philadelphia. Morello's Before Bruno: The history of the Philadelphia Mafia (Published by Jefferies and Manz, Philadelphia) is the history of the Mafia in the Philadelphia area from 1880 to 1959 when Angelo Bruno became boss of the Philadelphia crime family. Morello spent 15 years in research, during which time she personally interviewed over a dozen members of the American Mafia. Morello is "The only historian and criminologist in the United States specializing in Mafia history who is the descendant of the first Mafiosi in New York City, New Orleans and suburban Philadelphia."

In 1978, as a student at Loyola University, in Rome, Italy Morello visited with relatives in Sicily, where she became acquainted with the Sicilian Mafia in her family's history. From this, Morello posited the "Medieval Origins" of the Mafia.

Education
Honors program, Chestnut Hill College (Philadelphia): art history (magna cum laude) and classical civilizations (cum laude) 1980; master's in sociology/criminology at St Joseph's University (Phila.) 1994; master's in history at Villanova University, 2000. Certification, Paralegal studies, Villanova University. Licensed Realtor, 1982 to 1985. Morello also learned much from the Organized Crime Strikes Force of the U.S. Attorney's Office under Deputy Chief Prosecutor Albert C. Wicks.

Historical markers
Pennsylvania Historical and Museum Commission nominations and approved:
1. St. Augustine Church (Philadelphia)
2. St. Mary Magdalen de Pazzi Church
3. Gianinni family
4. Frank Gasparro
5. Mario Lanza
6. Eddie Lang
7. Joe Venuti
8. Tommy Loughran
9. Eddie Gottlieb
10. Harvey Pollack
11. Rabbi Israel Goldstein
12. St. John the Evangelist Catholic Church (Philadelphia, Pennsylvania)
13. Old St. Mary's Roman Catholic Church
14. Old St. Joseph's Church
15. Commodore John Barry
16. Philadelphia Zoo
17. American Bandstand
18. John Wanamaker
19. Mother's Day
20. Nicola Monachesi
21. Women's Medical College of Pennsylvania
22. Christian Street Hospital
23. South 9th Street Market
24. Benjamin Rush
25. Mathew Carey
26. Connie Mack
27. The Barrymore Family
28. Shibe Park
29. African American Baseball
30. Roy Campanella
31. Moyamensing Prison
32. Eastern State Penitentiary
33. Maxfield Parrish
34. W.C. Fields
35. Haym Solomon
36. House of Industry
37. Vincent Persichetti
38. The Mischianza
39. Palumbo's
40. Philadelphia Italian Market
41. Pat's Steaks
42. Samuel V. Merrick
43. Jewish Hospital of Philadelphia
44. The Trial of Hester Vaughan

Books By Morello
Philadelphia Italian Market Cookbook    
Beyond History -The Times and Peoples of St. Paul's Roman Catholic Church, 1843 to 1993.  ASIN: B0006EZ4VA
Before Bruno: The History of the Mafia in Philadelphia. Publication date: 4/28/2000, 
Before Bruno: The History of the Philadelphia Mafia, 1931-1946. Publication date: 11/28/2001, 
Before Bruno and How He Became Boss: The History of the Philadelphia Mafia, Book 3--1946-1959.  Publication date: 8/28/2005, 
Philadelphia's Italian Foods (Buchanan, 2006)
Philadelphia Cooks Italian (Buchanan, 2010)
 Villanova University Digital Library
("Celeste Morello Collection")
Also refer to nominations at Philadelphia Historical Commission.

References

American non-fiction writers
Writers from Philadelphia
Saint Joseph's University alumni
Villanova University alumni
Living people
Year of birth missing (living people)
American women non-fiction writers
21st-century American women